Oleg Yuriyevich Buryan (born 1959, Bila Tserkva, Ukraine) is a Russian artist, who lived in Moscow from the 1980s. In 2012, he moved to St-Petersburg, where he joined the St-Petersburg Union of Artists. He belongs to the first generation of post-Soviet creators, integrated in the international context.

Biography
Before deciding to become an artist, Buryan studied medicine at the Leningrad Medical Institute and worked as a lawyer's secretary, a street cleaner and as a censor for rock lyrics for the Moscow Chief of the Department of Culture.

Buryan received his art education (as tapestry artist) at the Moscow Textile College in the 1980s, and studied video art and independent documentary at Moscow State University from 1994 to 1995 (at Associate Professor Deirdre Boyle)).
In 1989, O. Buryan was awarded a VDNKh Silver medal for his contribution to Russian culture and became the last person to receive such an award in the Soviet period (1985–1991).
In his works various elements of archaic and "ethnic" art are evident.

"Recycled art" is another name for Buryan's art. Some of his sculptures are done as "ready-made" objects and related to the tradition of "Dada" in their absurd humor and strange beauty of animals with human eyes.
Buryan's works are characterized by a great amount of versatility in both choice of media and general style, ranging from an oil paintings to an art toys, from a book illustration to a monumental sculpture, from a media art to an installation art, TV and an industrial design.
After communicating with him is truly Renaissance sense of abundance, a rare luxury in which all enjoy—art, interesting people, breathtaking experience. Buryan does not seek for scandalize, or shock by some impressive movement. It is simply about to rebuild the lives in his understanding.
Buryan's works are in the collections of the Bank WestLB (Germany) and the Amer Sports (Finland), the University of Dundee (Scotland), the Kyiv National Museum of Russian Art, (Ukraine), the Saint Petersburg Toy Museum and the Venice Sculpture park.

Main shows and projects
 1986–1988: Autumn exhibitions at the Exhibition Hall at the Malaya Gruzinskaya Street, 28, Moscow (Russia)
 1988–1989: All–Union of Young Artists exhibition at the Central Exhibition Hall in Moscow Manege, Moscow (Russia)
 1990: WestLB Bank—the International Trade center (Hammer-Center), Moscow (Russia)
 1991: Performance "Citizens of the Night" at the Edinburgh Festival Theatre, 369 Gallery, Edinburgh (Scotland)
 1992: "International Incident" – solo show at the French Institute, Edinburgh (Scotland)
 1993: "Bald Buryans" – solo show at the Gallery "Dar" Contemporary Art Center, Moscow (Russia)
 1994: Collaboration with Cadogan Guides Publishers. Illustrations for the guide to Moscow and St. Petersburg, written by Rose Baring, London (UK), 
 1994: Foundation "Sirin prints" (postcards) together with W. Shon, Oxford (UK)
 1995: "Anabasis" at the National Museum of Russian Art, Kyiv (Ukraine)
 1996: "Serious Games" at the Toy Museum, St. Petersburg (Russia)
 1998: Solo Show at the Hanns Seidel Foundation, Kyiv (Ukraine) – Munich (Germany)

 2000: Solo show at the Italy–Russia Lombardy Association, Milan (Italy)
 2001: Collaboration with "Last Hero" ("Survival") TV ORT (artdirector), Panama City (Panama) – Moscow (Russia)
 2004: “Making Moves” at the Gallery "Six Chapel Row Contemporary Art", Bath (UK)
 2005: The International Art toys Show at "Haim+Handwerk", Munich (Germany)
 2005: “Not-naiv-toys done by Buryan” – solo show at the Toy museum, St. Petersburg (Russia)
 2005: "Recycled Art" – solo show at the Central House of Artist, Moscow (Russia)
 2005: Six sculptures for the Venice Sculpture park, Venice (Italy)
 2005: "Art toys in Burg Wildegg" (Austria)
 2006: Szpilman Award (short list), Berlin (Germany)
 2007: Concours Européen de Sculpture monumentale  "Art is Steel" at the Arcelor Mittal (short list, catalogue: O. Buryan "The Steel Drop", p.7), Rheims (France)
 2007: "Something’s Brewing Bier" for International project by Utrecht University (catalogue) Stedelijk Museum, Leiden (the Netherlands)
 2008: Mural "Grunewald" (300 sq meters), Noginsk (Russia)
 2008: ArtZept–2008 International Design Award (shortlist), Milan (Italy)
 2008: Project "Ecoart for Google maps" – the First Kronstadt International Ecological Festival of Arts "KronFest–2008", Kronstadt – St. Petersburg (Russia)
 2009: International Award of sculpture at the MAXXI - National Museum of the 21st Century Arts, Rome (Italy)
 2009: Buryans – Family Project "Genogram" for the European Cultural Foundation
 2009: Show "Dialogue" at the All–Russia Museum of Decorative–Applied and Folk Arts, Moscow (Russia)

References

External links
 Buryan's Studio
 Buryan's Face Facebook
 Buryan's  Blog LiveJournal
 Oleg Buryan

Projects
 Buryan's Projects on Rhiz.eu
 Ziggurat and Labyrinth on MyMondoMix

Press
 Iain McCallum, Dark Thoughts. "The Scotsman", 1991-09-04.
 Anne McElvoy, Home to the Masses. "The Times Magazine", 1994-02-19.
 Pepa Sparti,  Opere & Giorni. Dalla Russia: colori e passione. "Prometeo" n. 72, 2000-12-18.
 Chris Doss, Making art in a monkey house. "The Russia Journal", No 256, 2001-01-27.
 Dmitry Desyaterik,  Things in their field. The conversation with Oleg Buryan — the wizard of toys, pictures and bizarre stories. "Den'" ("Day"), Ukrainian Weekly Newspaper, No. 96, 2001-06-01.
 Alexander Mozhaev,  Pegasus's Stall. "Bol'shoj gorod" No. 32 2004-10-11.
 Saverio Simi de Burgis,  Venice Sculpture park. Magazine online "NonSoloCinema" No 24, 2005-09-09.
 Alexander Mozhaev,  Pegasus's Stall. "Аrkhnadzor", 2007-04-15.
 Dmitry Desyaterik,  The capital of colored melancholy. "Den'" ("Day"), Ukrainian Weekly Newspaper, No. 174, 2007-10-12.
 Sergey Lomakin,  All of our foolishness and small villainy. As "Pushka" broke birch. "Trud–7", No. 205, 2008-10-30.
 Dmitry Desyaterik,  Oleg Buryan: "They had to survive almost all". Exclusive interview with the artist of program "Last Hero". "Den'" ("Day"), Ukrainian Weekly Newspaper, No. 45, 2002-03-12
 Katerina Perhova,  High spirit and High–tech. "Domashniy rebenok" ("Home Child"), 2009-06-25.
 RT, Interview with Oleg Buryan. "Russia Today", 2008-02-27. (Video)
 Dmitriy Borko Events: Farewell to the lane, "Grani–TV" 2008-06-30. (Video)
 Leonid Aleev,  Pechatnikov Lane, 2009-03-02.
 Oleg Buryan,  Humanitarian Fund Pushkin in the hotel "YUnost'", 2009-03-28.
 Ahmad Nadalian, Journey Across Russia: Swimming Against the Tides, 2009-10-23.

Books
 Natalia Troyepolskaya, The Myth and Logos of Oleg Buryan. "Soviet Literature", Moscow: Published by the Union of Writers of the USSR, No. 1–4, 1990. 
 Marta Bruno, Strategies around international aid in post–socialist Russia. Surviving post–socialism. Local strategies and regional responses in eastern Europe and the former Soviet Union. Preview the title "Surviving post–socialism" using Google Book Search Edited by Sue Bridger, Frances Pine, London. Series: Routledge Studies of Societies in Transition. 1998.  

Russian people of Ukrainian descent
Modern artists
Russian contemporary artists
1959 births
Living people